Garnet Coulter  (August 1882 – 8 October 1975) was a Canadian politician serving as an alderman and the 35th Mayor of Winnipeg.

After graduating with a Bachelor of Law degree from the University of Manitoba, Coulter served as a lawyer in Winnipeg since 1907. He joined the Winnipeg School Board in 1924, serving as its chairman in 1932 and 1933.

In 1936, he left the school board and became a Winnipeg alderman for Ward Two. He was elected Winnipeg's Mayor in 1942, holding that position from 1943 until 1954. He established the Manitoba Flood Relief Fund following the 1950 Red River Flood.

Coulter remained single until 1948 when he married Jessica Allan, the first full-time Executive Director of the Canadian Federation of Mayors and Municipalities

References

1882 births
1975 deaths
Mayors of Winnipeg
Lawyers in Manitoba
Canadian King's Counsel
University of Manitoba alumni
Robson Hall alumni